Kari Erzsébet Kemény (23 January 1950 – 21 April 2021) was a Norwegian translator. She was also given the Karel Čapek Medal for translation in 2014 due to her entire 24 body work from the Magyar language into Norwegian.

Kemény died in Oslo on 21 April 2021, aged 71.

References

20th-century Norwegian translators
Norwegian translators
Norwegian women
Hungarian emigrants to Norway
1950 births
2021 deaths
People from Budapest
Place of death missing